Will Spencer (born 30 May 1992 in Oxford, England) is an English professional rugby union player. He plays at lock.  His current club is Bath and has previously played for Leicester Tigers, London Welsh and Worcester Warriors.

Career

On 13 January 2016, Spencer makes the move to local rivals Worcester Warriors from the 2016–17 season.

In May 2017 he was invited to a training camp with the senior England squad by Eddie Jones.

On 26 January 2018, Spencer signs for Premiership rivals Leicester Tigers ahead of the 2018–19 season.

He joined Bath ahead of the resumption of the 2019–20 season.

References

External links
Premiership Rugby Profile
European Professional Club Rugby Profile
Bath Profile

1992 births
Living people
English rugby union players
Bath Rugby players
Leicester Tigers players
Rugby union players from Oxford
Rugby union locks